Nylands Nation (NN) is one of the 15 student nations at the University of Helsinki, Finland's oldest, Swedish-speaking and established in 1643 at The Royal Academy of Turku. In 1828, the Academy moved to Helsinki taking the name "University" and Nylands Nation moved there along with the other Nations. Since 1904 the house of Nylands Nation, a building designed by Karl Hård af Segerstad, has stood at Kasarmikatu 40.

Friendship nations
Nylands nation has close connections with a number of student nations and fraternities at several foreign universities.

Uppsala
 Södermanlands-Nerikes nation
 Värmlands nation
 Västgöta nation

Lund
 Wermlands nation

Linköping
 Wermlands nation

Copenhagen
 Studenterforeningen vid Kobenhavns universitet

Oslo
 Det norske studentersamfund

Stockholm
 Humanistiska föreningen vid Stockholms universitet

Berlin
 VBSt Lysistrata

Marburg
 Marburger Burschenschaft Arminia

Tartu
 Korporatsioon Filiae Patriae
 Korporatsioon Ugala

Inspectors

Curators
Iris Wrede, 2020-
Anna Öhman, 2017-2020
Ina Scheinin, 2014-2017
Patrik Westerback, 2011-2014
Axel Nyman, 2008-2011
Jan D. Oker-Blom 2005-2008
Jonas Sundman 2002-2005
Charlotta af Hällström 1999-2002
Kati Sandelin 1996-1999

Further reading 
Eva Ahl (red.) m.fl., Minns du hur ödet oss förde tillhopa ...? Nylands nations och Värmlands nations gästvänskapsförbund 125 år, Nyland XI, Helsingfors, 2000, 
Eva Ahl (red.), Bränn, & Maria Vainio, 1904, Nyland XIII (Helsingfors, 2004) 
Michaela Bränn & Maria Vainio-Kurtakko, Galleria Nylandensis. Nylands nations samlingar, Nyland XIV, Helsingfors, 2008 
Joakim Hansson (red.) & Lars-Folke Landgrén, "Stark ström med egna vågor går genom hafvet. Nylands nations historia 1643–1993, Nyland X, Helsingfors, 1993, 
Arne Jörgensen, Nyländska avdelningens matrikel 1640–1868, Nyland VII, Helsingfors, 1911, Libris 2114291
Folke Landgrén, Nyländska avdelningens matrikel 1869–1900, Nyland IX, Helsingfors, 1932, Libris 10150675
Maria Vainio (red.), Nylands nationshus 1901–2001, Nyland XII, Helsingfors, 2001

National Romantic architecture in Finland
Art Nouveau architecture in Helsinki
Art Nouveau educational buildings
Residential buildings completed in 1904